Corinne P. Beauchemin (September 30, 1885 – June 17, 1972), known better by her pen name, Moïsette Olier was a Canadian writer from Quebec.

Biography
Corinne P. Beauchemin was born in Forges du Saint-Maurice, September 30, 1885.

Olier was a contributor to various newspapers including, Le Bien public, Le Nouvelliste, and Le Mauricien. Her work contributed to the regionalist literary stream, favored in particular by the tricentennial of the founding of Trois-Rivières. In 1934, the Trois-Rivières region went through a period of "literary renaissance".

Olier lived in Shawinigan. In 1929, she married Joseph Garceau, who was the first doctor in that city. In 1944, she moved to Montreal.

She chose the pseudonym, "Moïsette Olier", in reference to the name of her great-grandfather, Moses Olier. She died on June 17, 1972.

Honors
 Moïsette-Olier Street, Shawinigan, named in 1976.
 Moïsette-Olier Bay, a bay of Saint-Maurice, named in 1982.

Selected works
 L'Homme à la Physionomie macabre, Éditions Édouard Garand, 1927
 "Le St-Maurice", in Au pays de l’énergie, 1932
 Cha8inigane, 1934
 Mademoiselle Sérénité, 1936
 Cendres, 
 Étincelles, 1936

References

Citations

Bibliography 
 Carole Lamothe, La femme et l'amour dans l'œuvre romanesque de Moïsette Olier, thesis, Université du Québec à Trois-Rivières, 1981, published in 1983 (in French)

1885 births
1972 deaths
People from Mauricie
20th-century Canadian writers
20th-century Canadian women writers
Canadian writers in French
Pseudonymous women writers
20th-century pseudonymous writers